Ebenezer Allen may refer to:
 Ebenezer Allen (Vermont politician) (1743–1806)
 Ebenezer Allen (Texas politician) (1804–1863)
 Eben Allen (1868–1931), Australian businessman and politician